Lisa Tucker is an American author who is credited for three novels in young adult and adult fiction.

Biography
She grew up in suburban communities near Kansas City and St. Louis, Missouri. She has toured the Midwest with a jazz band, worked as a waitress, writing teacher, computer programmer, and math professor. Tucker holds a graduate degree in English from the University of Pennsylvania and a graduate degree in math from Villanova University. Her short story works and novellas have appeared in national publications including Seventeen Magazine, The Oxford American, and  The Philadelphia Inquirer. Tucker has appeared in national book clubs (including support from retailers such as Borders, Barnes & Noble, and Books-A-Million), CBS's Early Show, in public radio, and in syndicated television programs. When she is not writing, she sings jazz as a pastime. Tucker currently resides in New Mexico.

Bibliography
The Song Reader (Simon and Schuster, 2003)
Shout Down the Moon (Simon and Schuster, 2004)
Once Upon a Day (Atria Books, 2006)
The Cure For Modern Life (Simon and Schuster, 2008)
The Promised World (Atria, 2009))
''Played Nikki In Disney Channels Own Movie Love And Happiness(Clinton And Semore,2009)

External links
Official website
Teenreads

Living people
21st-century American novelists
American women novelists
People from the Kansas City metropolitan area
Writers from St. Louis
University of Pennsylvania alumni
Year of birth missing (living people)
Villanova University alumni
21st-century American women writers
Novelists from Missouri